The Wednesday Play is an anthology series of British television plays which ran on BBC1 for six seasons from October 1964 to May 1970. The plays were usually original works written for television, although dramatic adaptations of fiction (and occasionally stage plays) also featured. The series gained a reputation for presenting contemporary social dramas, and for bringing issues to the attention of a mass audience that would not otherwise have been discussed on screen.

Some of British television drama's most influential, and controversial, plays were shown in this slot, including Up the Junction and Cathy Come Home. The earliest television plays of Dennis Potter were featured in this slot.

History

Origins and early seasons
The series was suggested to the BBC's Head of Drama, Sydney Newman, by the corporation's director of television Kenneth Adam after his cancellation of the two previous series of single plays. Newman had been persuaded to join the BBC following the success of the similar programme Armchair Theatre, which he had produced while Head of Drama at ABC Weekend TV from 1958 to 1962. Armchair Theatre had tackled many difficult and socially relevant subjects in the then-popular 'kitchen sink' style, and still managed to gain a mass audience on the ITV network, and Newman wanted a programme that would be able to tackle similar issues with a broad appeal. Newman also wanted to get away from the BBC's reputation of producing safe and unchallenging drama programmes, to produce something with more bite and vigour, what Newman called "agitational contemporaneity".

The Wednesday Play succeeded in meeting this aim, and the BBC quickly developed the practice of stockpiling six or seven Wednesday Plays in case there were problems with individual works. One production, The War Game (1965), was withdrawn from broadcast by a nervous BBC under pressure from the government, while John Hopkins' Fable (20 January 1965), an inversion of South Africa's Apartheid system, was delayed for several weeks over fears that it would incite racial tensions.

Intended as a vehicle for new writers, several careers began thanks to the series. Television programmes had a much shorter lead time in this era, and Dennis Potter's first four accepted television plays were shown during the course of 1965. The two Nigel Barton plays (8 and 15 December 1965) first brought him to widespread public attention and the slightly earlier Alice (13 October 1965), about Lewis Carroll's relationship with Alice Liddell, developed themes to which Potter would return.

In the first half of 1966 a series of 26 Wednesday Plays were produced by Peter Luke, the playwright, and story edited by David Benedictus. Highlights included The Snow Ball (20 April 1966), adapted from the novel by Brigid Brophy, Toddler on the Run adapted by Shena Mackay from her novella and directed by James MacTaggart, (25 May 1966), Cock Hen and Courting Pit (renamed A Tour of the Old Floorboards, 22 June 1966) by David Halliwell and two plays by Frank O'Connor (which Hugh Leonard adapted) virtually without dialogue and which, renamed Silent Song, won The Prix Italia award in 1967 for 'original dramatic programmes' jointly with a French programme. The other O'Connor/Leonard work was The Retreat (11 May 1966). These two plays starred Milo O'Shea and Jack MacGowran. Cathy Come Home by Nell Dunn and Jeremy Sandford was offered to the Luke/Benedictus team who passed it on to Tony Garnett.

Tony Garnett and Ken Loach
Garnett was quickly seen as someone capable of delivering plays which would gain much publicity for the BBC and its Drama department. He had the enthusiastic support of Newman, his immediate superior, who lobbied for increased funding to allow for more location shooting on film rather than shooting productions in the multi-camera electronic television studio, a practice which was felt to impair realism, the preferred mode.

Director Ken Loach made ten plays in all for The Wednesday Play series. Two of them are among the best remembered of the entire run: an adaptation of Nell Dunn's Up the Junction (3 November 1965), and the saga of a homeless young couple and their battle to prevent their children being taken into local authority care: Cathy Come Home (16 November 1966). The latter began Loach's 13-year collaboration with Tony Garnett as his producer, although Garnett had been closely involved with Up the Junction as well.

Plays like Up the Junction though were controversial among more conservative viewers. The 'Clean-Up TV' campaigner Mary Whitehouse accused the BBC of portraying "promiscuity as normal" in Up the Junction and The Wednesday Play as featuring "Dirt, Doubt and Disbelief". The writer on television Anthony Hayward quoted Garnett in 2006: "Mary Whitehouse was on the prowl, which was an added frisson, but it was actually very good free publicity and helped the ratings." The "drama documentary" approach was criticised by television professionals who thought it was dishonest. In a Sunday Telegraph article published before its first repeat transmission Grace Wyndham Goldie complained that Cathy Come Home "deliberately blurs the distinction between fact and fiction ... [viewers] have a right to know whether what they are being offered is real or invented." Loach has admitted that "[w]e were very anxious for our plays not to be considered dramas but as continuations of the news" which preceded The Wednesday Play's slot.

Later seasons
The last three years of the strand were predominantly produced by Irene Shubik and Graeme MacDonald; by this time the BBC Drama head Sydney Newman had left the BBC. Highlights from this period include several plays by David Mercer such as In Two Minds (1 March 1967) and Let's Murder Vivaldi (10 April 1968) and Potter's Son of Man (16 April 1969), a modern interpretation of the story of Jesus.

Suffering from declining audience figures, the run of The Wednesday Play ended in 1970 when the day of transmission changed, and the series morphed into Play for Today.

Reputation and availability
It is regarded as one of the most influential and successful programmes to be produced in Britain during the 1960s and is still frequently referenced and discussed. In a 2000 poll of industry professionals conducted by the British Film Institute to find the 100 Greatest British Television Programmes of the 20th century, two Wednesday Plays made the list: The War Game was placed twenty-seventh, and Cathy Come Home was voted the second greatest British television programme of the century.

Some examples of The Wednesday Play, such as The War Game (which was not screened by the BBC for 20 years) and Cathy Come Home (1966), a television play exploring the theme of housing and homelessness, was according to filmmaker Roger Graef "a giant wakeup call for the whole nation," and some of the Potter plays, surfaced on VHS and DVD; the Potter play, Alice was a bonus feature of a Region 1 DVD in 2010 of Jonathan Miller's surrealist version of Alice in Wonderland. The Ken Loach material has resurfaced in a Ken Loach at the BBC set, and the two plays directed by Alan Clarke in the Alan Clarke at the BBC set. However, as with much British television of this era, many episodes are lost, leaving 79 surviving in the archives (along with 3 with some surviving sequences) out of 182 transmitted.

Productions
This table is based on records in the BBC Genome archive of the Radio Times. Titles billed as The Wednesday Play (or The Wednesday Play presenting: ...) in the Radio Times listings for their first or a subsequent transmission are included, plus an additional two for the reasons given in the notes. Repeats of the individual productions are excluded, as are some additional repeats from Theatre 625 shown in the Wednesday Play slot during 1968–69 but not billed as such in the Radio Times. All episodes were broadcast on BBC1, with the introduction of colour from November 1969.

The archival status has been ascertained for almost all productions based on the BFI National Archive and TV Brain online databases. Most of the extant versions are in the form of 16mm or 35mm black & white telerecordings (prints or negatives), or in a few cases original film versions where that was the original medium used for production. Some of the later plays exist in videotape formats.

The Wednesday Play on DVD
 Alice (written by Dennis Potter; directed by Gareth Davies), as an extra on the DVD of Jonathan Miller's 1966 Alice in Wonderland
 Cathy Come Home (written by Jeremy Sandford; directed by Kenneth Loach)
 The End of Arthur's Marriage (written by Christopher Logue; directed by Kenneth Loach)
 In Two Minds (written by David Mercer; directed by Kenneth Loach)
 The Nigel Barton Plays: Stand Up, Nigel Barton and Vote, Vote, Vote for Nigel Barton (written by Dennis Potter; directed by Gareth Davies)
 The Big Flame (written by Jim Allen; directed by Kenneth Loach)
 The War Game (written and directed by Peter Watkins)
 3 Clear Sundays (written by James O'Connor; directed by Kenneth Loach)
 Up the Junction (written by Nell Dunn; directed by Kenneth Loach)
 The Golden Vision (written by Neville Smith and Gordon Honeycombe; directed by Kenneth Loach)
 The Vortex (written by Noël Coward; directed by Philip Dudley), in the Noël Coward Collection, BBCDVD2566
 The Year of the Sex Olympics (written by Nigel Kneale, directed by Michael Elliott), DVD released by the BFI
 The Last Train through the Harecastle Tunnel (written by Peter Terson, directed by Alan Clarke), in the 'Alan Clarke at the BBC' box set from the BFI.
 Sovereign's Company (written by Don Shaw, directed by Alan Clarke), in the 'Alan Clarke at the BBC' box set from the BFI.

See also
 Armchair Theatre
 ITV Playhouse
 Play for Today
 Screen One
 Screen Two
 Theatre 625
 Thirty-Minute Theatre

References

Further reading
Evans, Jeff. The Penguin TV Companion (1st edn). London: Penguin Books. 2001. .
Vahimagi, Tise. British Television: An Illustrated Guide. Oxford: Oxford University Press / British Film Institute. 1994. .

External links
The Wednesday Play site with history and individual episodes listed
Encyclopedia of Television
TV Cream website

1964 British television series debuts
1970 British television series endings
1960s British drama television series
1970s British drama television series
1960s British anthology television series
1970s British anthology television series
BBC television dramas
Black-and-white British television shows
English-language television shows
Lost BBC episodes
Social realism
Wednesday
Television series created by Sydney Newman